This article lists all rugby league footballers who have represented the New South Wales City rugby league team in matches played against New South Wales Country since 1987 under the origin selection criteria. Players are listed according to the date of their debut game.

List of players

See also

 List of New South Wales Country Origin rugby league team players

External links
 RLP List of Players

 
N